Frank Lark Romero Berrocal, also known as Frank Romero (ロメロ・フランク, Romero Furanku, born August 19, 1987), is a Peruvian-Japanese footballer as a midfielder who currently plays for J3 club, Kagoshima United.

Club career
Romero moved to Japan to pursue academics, but a football scout identified him and he began a professional football career with Mito HollyHock. He would also play for Montedio Yamagata and Albirex Niigata, debuting in the J1 League with the former.

On 28 December 2021, Romero joined to J3 League club, Kagoshima United from Albirex Niigata as free transfer for 2022 season.

Personal Life
Born in Lima, Peru. He moved to japan at youth age.

He is third-generation Japanese Peruvian.

Romero obtained Japanese citizenship on 26 September 2019.

Career statistics
.

Honours
 Montedio Yamagata
 Emperor's Cup : 2014

References

External links

Profile at Kagoshima United

1987 births
Living people
Ryutsu Keizai University alumni
Footballers from Lima
Peruvian footballers
Japanese footballers
J1 League players
J2 League players
J3 League players
Mito HollyHock players
Montedio Yamagata players
Albirex Niigata players
FC Machida Zelvia players
Kagoshima United FC players
Association football midfielders
Peruvian people of Japanese descent
Naturalized citizens of Japan